Henry Phipps Jr. (September 27, 1839 – September 22, 1930) was an American entrepreneur known for his business relationship with Andrew Carnegie and involvement with the Carnegie Steel Company. He was also a successful real estate investor. After selling his stock in Carnegie Steel, he devoted a great deal of his time and money to philanthropic works.

Early life
Henry Phipps Jr. was born on September 27, 1839 in Philadelphia, Pennsylvania. His English parents, Henry Phipps, a shoemaker, and Hannah (née Franks), were married at Wolverhampton in 1824 and migrated to Philadelphia at some point after that, settling in Pittsburgh in 1845. Phipps was educated at public schools in Allegheny City, Pennsylvania. He had one sister, Amelia Phipps Walker (Mrs. John Walker; 1846-1887), and two brothers: William Henry Phipps (1825-1902), and John Phipps (1833-1860), who was also friends with Carnegie and who died young.

Phipps’s oldest brother, William Henry Phipps, was born on 27 March 1825 and baptized at Wellington, Shropshire, England, on 18 August 1830, which places the family’s emigration to the US during the 1830s.

Career
Phipps began working as a young man as an office boy and later a bookkeeper with Dillworth & Bidwell. In 1861, he became a partner in Bidwell & Phipps, which was an agent for the du Pont Powder Company, and a partner in Kloman & Phipps, a small iron mill.

Involvement with Carnegie
In 1865, he became a partner in childhood friend and neighbor Andrew (1835–1919) and Thomas Carnegie's (1843–1886) Union Iron Mills, which was created from a merger between Phipps' Kloman & Phipps and Cyclops Iron Company, an iron company which the Carnegies had acquired an interest in. Kloman and Phipps at first refused, but Thomas made an offer of all the shares in Cyclops plus an additional payment of $50,000.  Therefore, on May 1, 1865, the new Union Iron Mills Company was formed.

For the next year, Phipps and Carnegie went to Europe on tour, and when they returned in 1866, went to work. Phipps toiled for the next 20 years and proved a capable financier, becoming Carnegie's business partner in Carnegie Steel Company, founded in 1892, which would make him a very wealthy man as the company's second-largest shareholder. In 1901, Carnegie Steel Company was sold to the United States Steel Corporation; a newly formed organisation, set up by Pierpont Morgan. It sold for $400 million (approx. $13.3 billion today), of which $226 million went to Carnegie himself, and $48 million went to Phipps.

In 1907, Henry Phipps established Bessemer Trust Company to manage his substantial assets that would be shared by his offspring following his death.

Real estate
In 1909, Phipps expanded his Cape Cod holdings to the entire 800 acre Great Island Yarmouth, Massachusetts on Cape Cod, purchasing the remaining 50 acres from Charles B. Cory (1857–1921). The Cape Cod estate was next to Aberdeen Hall (which burnt down in September 1924) and was near Andrew Carnegie, Henry M. Flagler, and Henry Clay Frick's estates.

In 1912, Phipps divided $3,000,000 worth of real estate in Chicago, Illinois realty among his three sons. Later in the same year, he also gave his sons $10,000,000 worth of property in Pittsburgh.

In 1916, he purchased property in Great Neck, Long Island in the Village of Lake Success and in 1917, began construction on a thirty-nine-room Georgian mansion summer home, which was completed in 1919. He named the home, Bonnie Blink, which is Scottish for Pretty View. After his death, the mansion and property were donated to the school district and have since become William A. Shine Great Neck South High School.

In 1926, he bought Island Beach, which was sold by his heirs in 1953 to the State of New Jersey. Now known as Island Beach State Park, it is the last remaining stretch of undeveloped barrier island on the central New Jersey coast.

Phipps was one of the pioneer investors in Florida real estate. At one time, he and his family owned one-third of the town of Palm Beach, 28 miles (approximately 45 kilometers) of oceanfront between Palm Beach and Fort Lauderdale, prime bay front property in downtown Miami, and 29,653 acres (approximately 12,000 hectares) of land in Martin County. The Phipps family donated to the town of Palm Beach one of the most significant gifts in county history: an ocean-to-lake frontage property that is now known as Phipps Park.

Philanthropy

Phipps believed that those who have achieved great wealth should give back for the public good and create institutions dedicated to that purpose. As such he was involved with a number of philanthropic causes, the best known of which is the Phipps Conservatory and Botanical Gardens in Schenley Park, an 1893 gift to the city of Pittsburgh. Among his many benevolent works, he also funded the Phipps Institute for the Study, Treatment and Prevention of Tuberculosis at the University of Pennsylvania and The Henry Phipps Psychiatric Clinic at Johns Hopkins Hospital which in 1913 made possible the first inpatient facility in the United States for the mentally ill constructed as part of an acute care hospital.

Phipps was also an advocate of decent housing for the poor and in 1905 Phipps funded the non-profit Phipps Houses to build affordable housing in New York City. He gave $1,000,000 to build tenement houses for "working people."  Phipps Houses still operates to this day; Henry Phipps's great-grandson, Stuart S. Janney III, sits on its Board of Trustees.

Personal life
In 1872, Henry Phipps married Anne Childs Shaffer (1850–1934), the daughter of Margaret and John Shaffer, a Pittsburgh wagon builder. Since their estate Bonnie Brink was completed in 1919, they spent their summers in Great Neck, Long Island.  The couple had two daughters and three sons:

 Amy Phipps (1872–1959), who in 1905 married Frederick Edward Guest (1875–1937), the grandson of John Spencer-Churchill, 7th Duke of Marlborough and Winston Churchill's first cousin.
 John Shaffer Phipps (1874–1958), who in 1903 married Margarita Celia Grace, daughter of Michael P. Grace (1842–1920).
 Helen Margaret Phipps (1876–1934), who in 1904 married Bradley Martin in Scotland, brother-in-law of William Craven, 4th Earl of Craven (1868–1921).
 Henry Carnegie Phipps (1879–1953), who in 1907 married Gladys Livingston Mills (1883–1970).
 Howard Phipps (1881–1981), who in 1931 married Harriet Dyer Price, daughter of Theodore Hazeltine Price and granddaughter of Alexander B. Dyer (1815–1874).

Phipps died in Great Neck, New York on September 22, 1930, and his wife, Anne died in October 1934.

At his death, Phipps' estate was worth $3,121,810.32, according to transfer tax appraisal documents, of which $2,212,002 was in stocks and bonds, $926,679 was in properties, notes, cash and insurance bonds, and $375 in jointly owned property. His wife was the sole beneficiary of his estate according to his June 1, 1915 will.

See also
 Phipps family
 Phipps-McElveen Building
 Henry Phipps House

References
Notes

Sources
Bridge, James Howard. The Inside History of the Carnegie Steel Company: A Romance of Millions. New York: The Aldine Book Company, 1903.
Derbyshire, Wyn. Six Tycoons: The Lives of John Jacob Astor, Cornelius Vanderbilt, Andrew Carnegie, John D. Rockefeller, Henry Ford and Joseph P. Kennedy. London: Spiramus Press, 2008.
Nasaw, David. Andrew Carnegie. New York: Penguin Press, 2006.

Further reading

 November 23, 2003 New York Times article titled "Streetscapes/Henry Phipps and Phipps Houses; Millionaire's Effort to Improve Housing for the Poor"
 Halcyon Days: An American Family Through Three Generations by Peggie Phipps Boegner (daughter of John Shaffer Phipps), Richard Gachot (1987) Harry N. Abrams, Inc. 

American manufacturing businesspeople
American steel industry businesspeople
American philanthropists
1839 births
1930 deaths

American corporate directors
Philanthropists from Pennsylvania
Businesspeople from Pittsburgh
American people of English descent
Andrew Carnegie
19th-century American businesspeople
20th-century American businesspeople
Businesspeople from Philadelphia